The  West Bengal state assembly election of 1957 was part of a series of state assembly elections in 1957.

State Reorganization
On 1 November 1956, under States Reorganisation Act, 1956, a portion of the Purnea district east of the river Mahananda and the Purulia sub-district of the Manbhum district in the south (except Char Thana) were transferred from Bihar to West Bengal. Thus, assembly constituencies in West Bengal increased from 187 (238 seats) to 195 (252 seats) during 1957 assembly elections.

Alliances
On the political left two alliances had emerged; the United Left Election Committee (an alliance between the Communist Party of India, the Praja Socialist Party, the Forward Bloc, Marxist Forward Bloc and the Revolutionary Socialist Party) and the United Left Front (comprising the Socialist Unity Centre of India, the Bolshevik Party of India, the Republican Party and the Democratic Vanguard). A third alliance was the United Democratic People's Front, consisting of Bharatiya Jana Sangh, Hindu Mahasabha and the Revolutionary Communist Party of India.

Results

Alliance wise result
The election was won by the Indian National Congress, who got a majority of its own in the assembly. The communists became the largest opposition party.

! Party
! No. of candidates
! No. of elected
! No. of votes
! %
|- 
| Indian National Congress 
| 251
| 152
| 4,830,992
| 46.14%
|- 
| Communist Party of India 
| 103
| 46
| 1,865,106
| 17.81%
|- 
| Praja Socialist Party 
| 67
| 21
| 1,031,392
| 9.85%
|- 
| Forward Bloc 
| 26
| 8
| 425,318
| 4.06%
|- 
| Akhil Bharatiya Hindu Mahasabha 
| 37
| 25
| 225,126
| 2.15%
|- 
| Bharatiya Jana Sangh 
| 33
| 0
| 102,477
| 0.98%
|- 
| Independents
| 418
| 22
| 1,989,392
| 19.00%
|- 
| Total:
| 935
| 252
| 10,469,803
| 
|}

Elected members

See also
 1957 elections in India
 1952 West Bengal Legislative Assembly election

References

West Bengal
State Assembly elections in West Bengal
1950s in West Bengal